A naturalistic planned language is a constructed language specifically devised to reproduce the commonalities in morphology and vocabulary from a group of closely related languages, usually with the idea that such a language will be relatively easier to use passively – in many cases, without prior study – by speakers of one or more languages in the group.

The term is most commonly used to apply to planned languages predominantly based on the Romance languages, best known of which are Interlingue (previously known as Occidental) and Interlingua. Both were designed to serve as international auxiliary languages. However, there are also languages intended for speakers of a particular language family (zonal constructed languages), including Pan-Germanic, Pan-Slavic and even Pan-Celtic naturalistic planned languages.

Since the creation of such a language often includes shared idiosyncrasies from the source languages, active use seems to be generally more difficult to learn than for schematic planned languages, though because of grammatical simplification considerably easier than for ethnic languages of the same type.

See Also 
 Language planning

Constructed languages